The 2004 Lafayette Leopards football team represented Lafayette College in the 2004 NCAA Division I-AA football season. The team was led by Frank Tavani, in his fifth season as head coach. 

Lafayette played in its first post-season game ever at Delaware by virtue of winning the Patriot League co-championship.  Tavani was named a finalist for the Eddie Robinson Coach of the Year Award.

The Leopards played their home games at Fisher Field in Easton, Pennsylvania. All games were televised by the Lafayette Sports Network (LSN).

Schedule

References

Lafayette
Lafayette Leopards football seasons
Patriot League football champion seasons
Lafayette Leopards football